Fábio Santos Martins (born 24 July 1993) is a Portuguese footballer who plays as a winger for Saudi club Khaleej FC.

He made over 100 appearances and scored over 20 goals in both the Primeira Liga and Segunda Liga, representing four clubs in the former and three in the latter.

Club career
Born in Mafamude, Vila Nova de Gaia to Brazilian footballer Niromar (who played several years in Portugal in the same position), Martins spent most of his youth career at FC Porto. He played one season with their reserves in the Segunda Liga, his first match in the competition occurring on 12 August 2012 when he featured 86 minutes in a 2–2 away draw against C.D. Tondela.

On 27 August 2013, free agent Martins signed with C.D. Aves also in the second division. He spent the 2014–15 campaign with fellow league side S.C. Braga B, scoring a career-best 14 goals to help to a final 21st position (still above the relegation zone); it was with the first team of the latter that he first appeared in the Primeira Liga, coming on as a late substitute in the 2–0 home victory over F.C. Arouca on 15 February 2015.

Martins was loaned to F.C. Paços de Ferreira prior to the start of 2015–16. After featuring sparingly, he joined G.D. Chaves in the same situation, netting six times in the league including once in a 2–2 home draw to Sporting CP after a 30-meter chip that caught Rui Patrício off-guard.

On 25 October 2017, Martins renewed his contract with Braga until 2022, with the new buyout clause being set at €25 million. He contributed five goals from 27 appearances – ten starts – during the season, which qualified to the UEFA Europa League after the fourth-place finish.

On 22 June 2019, still owned by Braga, Martins moved to newly promoted F.C. Famalicão for the upcoming top-flight campaign. He was top scorer for the sixth-placed team during his spell, being sent off against Aves and C.S. Marítimo.

Martins was loaned to Al Shabab FC on 25 September 2020, as the Saudi Professional League club was coached by his compatriot Pedro Caixinha. A year later, he signed a two-year deal for Al Wahda FC in the UAE Pro League, for €3 million.

On 23 December 2022, Martins returned to the Saudi top tier with Khaleej FC on a free transfer.

International career
All categories comprised, Martins won 28 caps for Portugal at youth level and scored five goals. His only for the under-21s came on 2 June 2013, when he started the 2–0 friendly defeat of Croatia held in Rio Maior.

Career statistics

Club

References

External links

Portuguese League profile 

1993 births
Living people
Portuguese people of Brazilian descent
Sportspeople from Vila Nova de Gaia
Portuguese footballers
Association football wingers
Primeira Liga players
Liga Portugal 2 players
Padroense F.C. players
FC Porto B players
C.D. Aves players
S.C. Braga B players
S.C. Braga players
F.C. Paços de Ferreira players
G.D. Chaves players
F.C. Famalicão players
Saudi Professional League players
Al-Shabab FC (Riyadh) players
Khaleej FC players
UAE Pro League players
Al Wahda FC players
Portugal youth international footballers
Portugal under-21 international footballers
Portuguese expatriate footballers
Expatriate footballers in Saudi Arabia
Expatriate footballers in the United Arab Emirates
Portuguese expatriate sportspeople in Saudi Arabia
Portuguese expatriate sportspeople in the United Arab Emirates